Vikas Berry (born 1977, Pune, India) is an Indian-American scientist, engineer, and academic. He is a professor and department head of chemical engineering at the University of Illinois Chicago. He conducts research and develops technologies in the areas of bionanotechnology and two-dimensional materials (such as graphene and graphene nanoribbons). He holds the Dr. Satish C. Saxena professorship at University of Illinois Chicago and held the William H. Honstead endowed professorship at the Kansas State University from 2011 to 2014.

Background and Education
Berry grew up in New Delhi, India and graduated from TAPS-Delhi in 1995. He received his bachelor's degree in chemical engineering from the Indian Institute of Technology-Delhi in 1999. Then after working with Cadila Pharmaceuticals, he continued his education with a master's degree from the University of Kansas in 2003, and a doctorate degree from Virginia Polytechnic Institute and State University in 2006 under the direction of Ravi Saraf.

Research 
Berry has developed several bionanotechnologies, including COVID detector, cancer detectors, ALS sensors, microbial fuel cells, biocompatible papers, and DNA-transistors. He has also developed nano-devices such as ultrafast detectors, photodetector, sodium-ion batteries, 3D printing gels, Raman enhancer, IR-sensor, molecular machines, and graphene liquid cells for TEM. Berry has also contributed to 2D material science and technology, including nanotomy, 2D synthesis and growth, non-destructive graphene functionalization, boron nitride chemistries, gold nanostructures, microwave induced reduction and nanocrystallization, wrinkles in 2D nanomaterials, and 2D Composites

Berry's research has been featured in several national publications, including The Economist, Washington Post, Wall Street Journal, The Engineer, Zee News, New Electronics, Nature, and other outlets.

References

External links 
Berry Research Laboratory – Page
UIC Faculty Page for Vikas Berry
Prof. Berry speaks about his research
Washington Post Article on Berry's Research on Bacterial Spores in Electronic Devices
The Economist discusses Berry's Research on Graphene Wrinkle Devices on Bacteria
Wall Street Journal discusses Berry's Research on A Tiny Robot Senses Humidity
Photonic Media discusses Berry's research on graphene-wrapped bacteria

21st-century American chemists
American materials scientists
American physical chemists
21st-century American scientists
University of Illinois Chicago faculty
American chemical engineers
IIT Delhi alumni
Virginia Tech alumni
1977 births
Living people